Förster or Foerster is a German surname meaning "forester". (It has often been Anglicised as Forster). Notable people of this name include:

Förster
 Arnold Förster (1810–1884), a German entomologist
 August Förster (physician) (1822–1865), a German anatomist and pathologist 
 Bernd Förster (born 1956), a German footballer (brother of Karlheinz)
 Christoph Förster (1693–1745), a German composer
 Eckart Förster, a professor of philosophy at Johns Hopkins University
 Elisabeth Förster-Nietzsche (1846–1935), the sister of Friedrich Nietzsche 
 Emmanuel Aloys Förster (1748–1823), a musician and teacher in Vienna
 Ernst Joachim Förster (1800–1885), a German art critic
 Franz Förster (1819–1878), a German jurist
 Friedrich August Förster (1829–1897), a German piano maker and entrepreneur, August Förster (de) 
 Friedrich Christoph Förster (1791–1868), a German historian and poet
 Friedrich Förster (1908–1999), a German spec. NDT, Фёрстер, Фридрих (ru)
 Heiko Mathias Förster (born 1966), German conductor
 Heinrich Förster (bishop) (1800–1881), a German Roman Catholic bishop
 Helmuth Förster (1889–1965), a Luftwaffe general during World War II
 Karl Förster (1784–1841), a German poet and translator
 Karlheinz Förster (born 1958), a German football player (brother of Bernd)
 Kerstin Förster (born 1965), a German rower (wife of Olaf)
 Ludwig Förster (1797–1863), an architect
 Olaf Förster (born 1962), a German rower (husband of Kerstin)
 Theodor Förster (1910–1974), a physicist and chemist, discoverer of Förster resonance energy transfer

Foerster 
 Heinz von Foerster (1911–2002), an Austro-American founder of cybernetics
 Josef Bohuslav Foerster (1859–1951), a Czech composer of classical music
 Otfrid Foerster (1873–1941), a German neurologist
 Wendelin Förster (or Foerster) (1844–1915), German philologist and Arthurian scholar
 Wilhelm Julius Förster (or Foerster) (1832–1921), a German astronomer

See also 
 Forester (disambiguation)
 Forrester (surname)
 Forster (surname)
 Foster (disambiguation)
 Fosters (disambiguation)
 Vorster

German-language surnames